Mythology is the fourth solo album by keyboard player Derek Sherinian. Sherinian again draws upon some of the greatest talent from the worlds of rock and jazz music. Among the artists appearing on Mythology are jazz fusion player Allan Holdsworth (U.K., Soft Machine, Level 42), Steve Lukather (Toto), Simon Phillips (Toto, Jeff Beck, The Who), Zakk Wylde (Ozzy Osbourne, Black Label Society), Grammy award winner Steve Stevens (Billy Idol), Jerry Goodman (Mahavishnu Orchestra, Dixie Dregs), and a very rare guest appearance from guitarist John Sykes (Whitesnake, Thin Lizzy, Blue Murder).

Track listing
"Day of the Dead" – 8:20 (Sherinian/Tichy)
"Alpha Burst" – 4:55 (Stevens)
"God of War" – 5:16 (Sherinian/Tichy)
"El Flamingo Suave" – 4:54 (Sherinian/Stevens)
"Goin' To Church" – 4:46 (Sherinian)
"One Way or the Other" – 4:56 (Goodman/Phillips/Sherinian)
"Trojan Horse" – 3:55 (Sherinian/Tichy)
"A View from the Sky" – 4:55 (Stevens)
"The River Song" – 3:51 (Sherinian/Wylde)

Musicians
Derek Sherinian - keyboards
Zakk Wylde - guitar  (tracks 1, 3 and 9), vocals (track 9)
Steve Stevens - guitar  (tracks 2, 4, and 8)
Allan Holdsworth - guitar (tracks 1 and 6)
John Sykes - guitar (track 3)
Steve Lukather - guitar (track 5)
Tony Franklin - bass guitar (tracks 1, 2, 5 and 8)
Marco Mendoza - bass guitar (tracks 3, 4, 7 and 9)
Rufus Philpot - bass guitar (track 6)
Jerry Goodman - violin (tracks 1 and 6)
Simon Phillips - drums (tracks 2, 4-6, 8 and 9)
Brian Tichy - drums (tracks 1, 3, 7 and 9), additional guitars (tracks 1, 3 and 7)
Mike Shapiro - percussion

References

External links
2005 audio interview about Mythology and other aspects of Sherinian's career

Derek Sherinian albums
2004 albums
Albums produced by Simon Phillips (drummer)
Inside Out Music albums